Nicholas John Richardson (born 11 April 1967) is a former English professional footballer, who played in the Football League between the 1980s and 2000s.

Halifax and Cardiff
Born in Halifax, Yorkshire, Richardson began his career playing non-league football for Emley before joining Halifax Town in 1988. He quickly established himself in the side and was a regular for three and a half seasons before signing for Cardiff City for £35,000. During his first season he won both a Division Three title and a Welsh Cup winners medal, after the Bluebirds beat Rhyl 5–0 in the final.

He had loan spells at Wrexham and Chester City,

Bury and Chester
He left to join Bury in 1995 where he spent just one month before moving permanently to Chester City for £40,000.

Later career
Richardson returned to The Football League with York City for a year before joining Harrogate Town. After 9 years as a qualified Computing and IT teacher he now runs a business AIM-FOR along with his brother Lee also a former professional footballer.

Personal life
Nick's younger brother Lee was also a footballer and played alongside him during his time at Halifax.

References

1967 births
Living people
English footballers
Association football midfielders
Halifax Town A.F.C. players
Cardiff City F.C. players
Wrexham A.F.C. players
Chester City F.C. players
Bury F.C. players
York City F.C. players
English Football League players
National League (English football) players
Frickley Athletic F.C. players
Harrogate Town A.F.C. players
Ossett Town F.C. players
Footballers from Halifax, West Yorkshire
Spennymoor United F.C. players